Immobile, an album by Autour de Lucie, was released in 1998 on the Nettwerk label. Total running time is 41:33.

Track listing
 "Selon l'humeur" – 1:49
 "Immobile" – 3:07
 "Qu'avons-nous fait" – 4:00
 "Chanson sans issue – ne vois-tu pas" – 3:21
 "La vérité – sur ceux qui mentent" – 4:31
 "Sur tes pas" – 3:21
 "Sagrada familia" – 1:22
 "L'eau qui dort" – 2:56
 "L'autre nous" – 3:58
 "Les promesses" – 3:42
 "Je vous ai tué ce matin" – 3:26
 "Atomium" – 1:53
 "La deuxième chance" – 4:07
 "Chanson sans issue – ne vois-tu pas" – remix – 6:21

References

External links
 Lyrics & chords

Autour de Lucie albums
1998 albums